Hésingue is a commune in the Haut-Rhin department in Alsace in north-eastern France. It is close to both the Swiss and German borders, and is around six kilometres from the centre of Basel.

Gallery

See also
 Communes of the Haut-Rhin département

References

External links

Official website

Communes of Haut-Rhin